Diego Nakache (born 23 February 1996) is an Argentine professional footballer who plays as a forward for Atlanta.

Career
Nakache's career started with Atlanta. He appeared for his professional debut on 17 April 2017 in Primera B Metropolitana, replacing Nicolás Previtali after eighty minutes of a home defeat to UAI Urquiza; his first start arrived five days later against Barracas Central. During a Copa Argentina encounter with Primera División side San Martín in June 2017, Nakache scored the first two goals of his senior career in a 0–3 win. In total, he made sixteen appearances across the 2016–17 and 2017–18 seasons. Nakache spent 2019–20 out on loan with Comunicaciones, scoring three goals across a total of twenty matches.

Career statistics
.

References

External links

1996 births
Living people
People from Moreno Partido
Argentine footballers
Association football forwards
Primera B Metropolitana players
Club Atlético Atlanta footballers
Club Comunicaciones footballers
Sportspeople from Buenos Aires Province